Symbol Promenade Park is a park in Odaiba, Tokyo, Japan. The park opened in 1996.

The Flame of Freedom is installed in the park.

References

External links

 

Odaiba
Parks and gardens in Tokyo